Mohamed Camara (born 1959 in Conakry) is a Guinean film director and actor based in France. He studied at the Atelier Blanche Salant in Paris. He has explored controversial topics in his films such as incest (Denko), child suicide (Minka) and homosexuality (Dakan). 1997's Dakan has been called the first film on homosexuality by a Black African.

Camara has won several international awards for his films, including the Grand Jury Award for Outstanding Foreign Narrative Feature at L.A. Outfest for Dakan.

In North America, Camara is perhaps best known for his performance as Ousmane in the wildly popular educational series French in Action.

Filmography

Actor

Director

References

External links
 

1959 births
Guinean actors
Guinean film directors
Living people
Guinean expatriates in France